Lee Jun-yeong (born March 24, 1987), better known by his stage name, Nucksal, is a South Korean rapper. He debuted in 2009 as a member of the hip hop duo Future Heaven, and became one of the most popular rappers in South Korea's underground hip hop scene. He gained mainstream recognition in 2017 after finishing in second place on the TV rap competition show, Show Me The Money 6.

Personal life 
On July 1, 2022, it was confirmed that Nucksal had been dating a non-celebrity woman for two years. They were married on September 24, 2022, in the presence of friends and family in Gangnam, Seoul.

In February 2023, his wife gave birth to their first child after five months of marriage.

Discography

Studio albums

Singles

Filmography

Television shows

Web shows

Radio shows

Music video appearances

Awards and nominations

References

External links
 Nucksal on Vismajor Company

Living people
People from Seoul
Rappers from Seoul
South Korean male rappers
Show Me the Money (South Korean TV series) contestants
1987 births